Pottawattamie Park is a town in Michigan Township, LaPorte County, Indiana, United States. The population was 235 at the 2010 census. It is included in the Michigan City, Indiana-La Porte, Indiana Metropolitan Statistical Area.

History
Pottawattamie Park was incorporated in 1936 on land once inhabited by the Potawatomi Indians.

Geography
Pottawattamie Park is located at  (41.720889, -86.867177).  It is completely surrounded by the city of Michigan City.

Demographics

2010 census
As of the census of 2010, there were 235 people, 102 households, and 68 families living in the town. The racial makeup of the town was 92.3% White, 7.2% African American, and 0.4% from two or more races. Hispanic or Latino of any race were 0.4% of the population.

There were 102 households, of which 21.6% had children under the age of 18 living with them, 61.8% were married couples living together, 3.9% had a female householder with no husband present, 1.0% had a male householder with no wife present, and 33.3% were non-families. 29.4% of all households were made up of individuals, and 14.7% had someone living alone who was 65 years of age or older. The average household size was 2.23 and the average family size was 2.76.

The median age in the town was 53.1 years. 18.7% of residents were under the age of 18; 3% were between the ages of 18 and 24; 20.8% were from 25 to 44; 32.4% were from 45 to 64; and 25.1% were 65 years of age or older. The gender makeup of the town was 47.7% male and 52.3% female.

2000 census
As of the census of 2000, there were 300 people, 121 households, and 86 families living in the town. The racial makeup of the town was 80.00% White, 16.33% African American, 0.67% Asian, 1.33% from other races, and 1.67% from two or more races. Hispanic or Latino of any race were 1.67% of the population.

There were 121 households, out of which 26.4% had children under the age of 18 living with them, 62.0% were married couples living together, 8.3% had a female householder with no husband present, and 28.1% were non-families. 25.6% of all households were made up of individuals, and 15.7% had someone living alone who was 65 years of age or older. The average household size was 2.37 and the average family size was 2.84.

In the town, the population was spread out, with 21.7% under the age of 18, 5.0% from 18 to 24, 22.3% from 25 to 44, 28.7% from 45 to 64, and 22.3% who were 65 years of age or older. The median age was 46 years. For every 100 females, there were 92.3 males. For every 100 females age 18 and over, there were 89.5 males.

The median income for a household in the town was $37,500, and the median income for a family was $46,750. Males had a median income of $63,750 versus $22,292 for females. The per capita income for the town was $24,383. About 3.4% of families and 8.6% of the population were below the poverty line, including 2.9% of those under the age of eighteen and 4.5% of those 65 or over.

References

Towns in LaPorte County, Indiana
Towns in Indiana